Jay S. Amyx (September 27, 1923 – January 24, 2014) served two terms as mayor of Boise, Idaho, United States, from 1966 to 1974.

Career 
After graduating high school, Amyx enlisted in the United States Air Force and worked as an electrician before founding a construction company in Boise. In 1963, Amyx ran for mayor of Boise against the incumbent, Eugene Shellworth, but lost in the general election.

In November 1965, Amyx became the first Boise mayor elected to a four-year term, defeating incumbent Eugene Shellworth in a runoff. Previous mayoral elections in Boise had been held in April and for two-year terms. Amyx was re-elected in 1969. During his first term in office, Amyx dealt with multiple controversies, including an obscenity scandal relating to the 1968 film Candy and a protest of 200 women against sexist standards in the fashion industry. He chose not to run for re-election in 1974.

Amyx ran for the Republican nomination for governor in 1978, but finished last among a field of six in the primary election.

Personal life 
Amyx was born in Decatur, Texas on September 27, 1923. He was an ordained minister in the Baptist tradition. He was married and had five children. He died on January 24, 2014.

Sources
Mayors of Boise - Past and Present
Idaho State Historical Society Reference Series, Corrected List of Mayors, 1867-1996

References

1923 births
2014 deaths
Idaho Republicans
Mayors of Boise, Idaho
People from Decatur, Texas